Lionel Sackville-West may refer to:
 Lionel Sackville-West, 2nd Baron Sackville, British diplomat
 Lionel Sackville-West, 3rd Baron Sackville, British peer
 Lionel Sackville-West, 6th Baron Sackville, British peer and stockbroker